Sarkhuiyeh (also Romanized as Sarkhūīyeh; also known as Sarkhūeeyeh) is a village in Jowzam Rural District, Dehaj District, Shahr-e Babak County, Kerman Province, Iran. At the 2006 census, its population was 46, in 8 families.

References 

Populated places in Shahr-e Babak County